Mojibur Rahman SBP, OSP, PBGMS, PPMS, ndc, psc is a major general in the Bangladesh Army and the current Director General of Special Security Force.

Early life
Rahman was born on 16 June 1968 in Narayanganj District. His Father, AKM Bazlur Rahman was a valiant freedom fighter, devoted language movement activist, close companion of Bangabandhu Sheikh Mujibur Rahman and recipient of Independence Award. His uncle, R.K Chowdhury was a freedom fighter, Political Advisor of the 2nd and 3rd sector in the liberation war, and former treasurer of Awami League.

Career
Rahman was commissioned in the 18th long course of the Bangladesh Military Academy in the Infantry corps on 24 June 1988. He graduated from the Defence Services Command and Staff College. He graduated from the National University, Bangladesh. He completed his master's degree in Defence and Strategic Studies from the University of Madras in India.He Completed his NDC from, NDC India. He taught at the School of Infantry and Tactics.

Rahman served as the General Staff Officer of Military Intelligence Directorate and Directorate General of Forces Intelligence. He was the Additional Director General of Operations of the Rapid Action Battalion. He served as the Commander, 46th Independent Infantry Brigade. He served as the Additional Director General of Border Guard Bangladesh. On 31 July 2018, he was promoted to Major General. He took over the command of SSF on 6th August, 2018.

Personal life 
He is happily married to Mrs Tasrin Mujib. The couple is blessed with two sons and one daughter.

References

Living people
Bangladesh Army generals
1968 births
People from Narayanganj District